Matthew Dane Cardey (born 7 July 1975) is a New Zealand born former international rugby union fullback who played for the Wales national rugby union team.

He played his club rugby for Llanelli RFC and was initially implicated in the "grannygate" scandal but exonerated.

Cardey switched from Llanelli to Leeds Tykes in 2003.

References

External links
 Wales profile

1975 births
Living people
New Zealand rugby union players
Wales international rugby union players
Leeds Tykes players
Llanelli RFC players
People from Papakura
New Zealand expatriate sportspeople in Wales
Rugby union fullbacks
Rugby union players from Auckland